Sharp County Regional Airport  is a public-use airport in Sharp County, Arkansas, United States. It is located three nautical miles (4 mi, 6 km) northeast of the central business district of Ash Flat, Arkansas. The airport is owned by the Sharp County Regional Airport Authority.

This airport is included in the FAA's National Plan of Integrated Airport Systems for 2011–2015, which categorized it as a general aviation airport.

Although most U.S. airports use the same three-letter location identifier for the FAA and IATA, this airport is assigned CVK by the FAA and CKK by the IATA.

Facilities and aircraft 
Sharp County Regional Airport covers an area of 60 acres (24 ha) at an elevation of 716 feet (218 m) above mean sea level. It has one runway designated 4/22 with an asphalt surface measuring 5,156 by 75 feet (1,572 x 23 m). For the 12-month period ending May 31, 2010, the airport had 4,400 aircraft operations, an average of 12 per day: 98% general aviation and 2% military.

References

External links 
 Sharp County Regional Airport (CVK) at Arkansas Department of Aeronautics
 Aerial image as of 6 March 2000 from USGS The National Map
 

Airports in Arkansas
Transportation in Sharp County, Arkansas